Robert Alan Cutietta (born 1953) is best known as an educator, author, researcher, composer, and arts leader.   He is the author or co-author of five books and over fifty referereed research articles in the area of music psychology and education.   He is also a composer, having written for television shows and movies.

Early career
Cutietta began his musical career performing as a bassist in the Cleveland, Ohio area.  By 1970 he was both performing in clubs and working as a studio musician recording commercials and demos with a variety of artists.  While pursuing his performing, he completed a  bachelor's and master's degree from Cleveland State University in choral music education (1974 & 1978).  He continued to perform but also became the choir director at Horace Mann Middle School and Lakewood High School, both in Ohio.   In 1973 he became a minister of music within the Methodist Church, a position he maintained continuously in a variety of congregations until 2003.

Research career
In 1979 he left teaching to earn a doctorate in music education and psychology at Pennsylvania State University (1982).   It was during this time that he began his career as a researcher and author.

He has held  professorships at Montana State University, Kent State University, The University of Arizona, and The University of Southern California.

His many books include "Who Knew?! Questions you never thought to ask about Classical Music" [Oxford University Press, 2017] "Raising Musical Kids: A Parent's Guide (Oxford University Press, 2013), Encountering the Fundamentals of Music (Mayfield Publishing. 1989) and Spin-offs: The Extra-Musical Advantages of a Musical Education (UMI, 1998).  He also is an author of chapters in both of the Handbooks on Music Learning and Teaching as well as author of multiple articles in the Journal of Research in Music Education, Psychology of Music, the Bulletin of the Council for Research in Music Education, Music Educators Journal, and a host of other national and international journals.  He is a regular contributing author to the PBS Parent's Website.

Composer
In 2003, upon moving to Los Angeles, he began composing for television and movies.  His first endeavor was Lost Legends of the West, a 13-episode folk history of the American West that was nominated for two Emmy Awards.  In 2006, he researched, composed, and orchestrated original and historic music for the documentary Welcome Back Riders.

Positions

Cutietta has been a professor of Music from 1981 to the present at Montana State University, Kent State University, The University of Arizona, and (Currently). The University of Southern California. 

He served as Dean of the Thornton School of Music for 20 years (four terms) before stepping down in 2022.   During his time as dean, he was credited with leading the creation of many innovative degrees including a Popular Music, a Redesign of how classical Music is taught, song writing, music production, and Arts Leadership.

From 2006 to 2016 he hosted a weekly radio segment on Classical KUSC entitled "Ask the Dean".

He is a founding member of Montana Public Broadcasting (PBS), and is, or has been, a member of the Advisory Board of Classical KUSC Radio in Los Angeles, The Orange County School of the Arts, The Maestro Foundation, Fender Music Foundation and the GRAMMY Blue Ribbon Adjudication Committee. In 2011, he was appointed Chairman of the Board of USC Fisher Museum of Art in Los Angeles. He is listed in Who's Who in America, and was designated the 2001 Alumni of the Year from the College of Arts and Architecture at Penn State University. In 2007, he received the Amicus Poloniae Award from the Government of the Republic of Poland for outstanding achievement in promoting the Arts.  Cleveland State University awarded him the 2008 Alumni of the Year from the College of Arts and Letters. In 2022, he was awarded the Presidential Medallion, the highest award granted, by the University of Southern California. 

As of 2022 he is a faculty member and former Dean of the Thornton School of Music at The University of Southern California.  Robert Alan Cutietta is the father of Nathan Cutietta, a documentary filmmaker. In late 2012, he was asked to create the Glorya Kaufman School of Dance, the first new school at USC in 41 years. He was appointed as the inaugural Dean of the Glorya Kaufman School of Dance at the University of Southern California that same year.

He also served on the National Board of Directors at Little Kids Rock.

Related Readings
Raising Musical Kids:  A Parent's Guide

Ask the Dean Podcasts

Earlier Ask the Dean Podcasts

Pasadena Weekly Magazine

USC Biography

References 

1953 births
Cleveland State University alumni
Penn State College of Education alumni
Kent State University faculty
Montana State University faculty
University of Arizona faculty
USC Thornton School of Music faculty
American music educators
Music psychologists
Living people
American film score composers
American male film score composers